Glion may refer to:
Glion, a village in the municipality of Montreux in the canton of Vaud, Switzerland
Glion Institute of Higher Education, a university in Switzerland
Glion, Japanese for Gliscor, fictional species #472 of Pokémon in the Pokémon media franchise